"Burning Inside" is a song by American industrial metal band Ministry. It was released as the sole single from the band's 1989 album The Mind Is a Terrible Thing to Taste. 

The song is featured in the intro movie of the video game Scarface: The World Is Yours.

Track listing

Background

Video 
A video for the song was released in late 1989 and became a hit on MTV's 120 Minutes. The video features the band's live show with the steel fence used on the 1989-1990 tour and later a live version of the song featured on In Case You Didn't Feel Like Showing Up. Also shown in the video are a chaotic audience, a few people on fire, and the band performing onstage.

Cover 
The singles cover appears to depict People's Liberation Army soldiers, with one individual holding Mao's red book.

Personnel

Ministry
Al Jourgensen - vocals (1, 2), guitar, programming (1, 2), production
Paul Barker - bass guitar, programming (1, 2), production

Additional personnel
Bill Rieflin - drums (1, 2), programming (1, 2), guitar (3)
Joe Kelly - background vocals (1)
Nivek Ogre - vocals (3)
Jeff Ward - drums (3)
Dave Ogilvie - keyboards (3)
Tom Baker - mastering

Covers
The song was covered in 2000 by the heavy metal band Static-X, featuring Burton C. Bell of Fear Factory. The cover was featured on the soundtrack to The Crow: Salvation.

Charts

References

1989 singles
Ministry (band) songs
1989 songs
Sire Records singles
Warner Records singles
Songs written by Al Jourgensen
Songs written by Paul Barker
Songs written by Bill Rieflin
Songs about drugs